Embakasi Constituency, (formerly known as, Nairobi East Constituency), was a former electoral constituency in Kenya. It was one of eight constituencies of Nairobi Province. It consisted of eastern and southeastern suburbs of Nairobi. With 164,227 registered voters, it was the most populous constituency in Kenya. It covered the Eastlands part of Nairobi. Embakasi constituency had common boundaries with Embakasi Division. The entire constituency was located within Nairobi City Council area. The constituency had an area of 208 km².

The division has since been split into Embakasi South Constituency, Embakasi North Constituency, Embakasi Central Constituency, Embakasi East Constituency, and Embakasi West Constituency; Two of its regions, Njiru and Ruai were hived off from Embakasi Constituency and combined with Kasarani Constituency.

Members of Parliament

Mugabe Were
In the early morning hours of January 27, 2008, the Member of Parliament for Embakasi Constituency, Mugabe Were, was shot dead by two gunmen near Kifaru Primary School. According to news reports, Mugabe had just arrived at his compound when the gunmen attacked him while still in his car, before the gate could be opened. Mugabe was elected as a member of the Orange Democratic Movement, Kenya's opposition party. Speculation as to whether or not this was a political assassination already surrounds the killing. If so, this would mark a new stage in the continuing crisis over the disputed presidential election of December 27, 2007.

Locations and wards

References

External links 
Map of Embakasi Constituency
Uchaguzikenya.com - Embakasi Constituency

Constituencies in Nairobi
Former constituencies of Kenya
Constituencies established in 1969
Constituencies disestablished in 2013